Voltaire Calahi Vallejo, simply known as Volts Vallejo, is a Filipino songwriter and recording artist who rose to popularity when his song "Hey Crush" was chosen as the official theme song for the Metro Manila Film Festival movie Vince & Kath & James under Star Cinema.

Early life
Volts was born in Nueva Ecija, Philippines to Rodolfo and Zenaida Vallejo on October 23, 1991. Volts started out as a dancer and a commercial model before learning how to play the guitar and composing songs.

Musical career
Volts started his musical career on YouTube, posting vlogs and song covers on his own channel. He was later discovered by a local online music hub and discovery site. Volts big break happened when he submitted his song "Hey Crush"  to Star Cinema. The song was released on 2016 as his first single. A version of the song was also released by Star Music with Star Magic talent Joshua Garcia lending his vocals to the song.

Volts became the first signed artist of One Music PH. He recorded his self-titled EP in March 2017, with famed local record producer Roque Santos producing the EP. The self-titled EP was released on June 14, 2017, with "Tatapangan" serving as his first single.

Discography

Singles

Awards and nominations

References

External links
One Music PH Artist Page.
Facebook Page.

21st-century Filipino male singers
ABS-CBN personalities
Singers from Nueva Ecija
Living people
Year of birth missing (living people)